The University Ferhat Abbas of Setif "Université Ferhat Abbas de Sétif (UFAS)" is a university located in Setif, Algeria. It was founded in 1978.

See also 
 List of universities in Algeria

References

External links
 http://www.univ-setif.dz/

1978 establishments in Algeria
Educational institutions established in 1978
Setif
Buildings and structures in Sétif Province